Dreamcast Collection is a video game compilation developed and published by Sega for the Xbox 360 and Microsoft Windows. A PlayStation 3 version was planned but was scrapped for unknown reasons. The original compilation included four of the best-selling video games for the Dreamcast. Although each of the games by themselves all received positive reviews, the original compilation received mostly mixed to negative reviews and was heavily criticized for the compilation's game selection. The 2016 version (which includes three additional best-sellers) was met with positive reviews.

Games 
The original collection includes four games from the Dreamcast: three which were also part of the Sega All Stars budget range, plus Space Channel 5: Part 2, released simultaneously for the Dreamcast and PlayStation 2 in Japan, then later released exclusively for the PlayStation 2 outside of Japan. All games released in the bundle are available for purchase separately on the Xbox Live Arcade, PlayStation Network and Steam. A retail release was originally listed for release on the PlayStation 3 but it was put on hold.

Dreamcast Collection was later reissued on July 22, 2016 for Steam, adding two games (NiGHTS into Dreams and Jet Set Radio), which are a part of the Sega Heritage Collection. It was updated once again on April 7, 2020 to include Sonic Adventure 2, which completes the collection. The games can be purchased either collectively or individually on Steam.

List of games

Reception 

Dreamcast Collection has received mostly "mixed to negative" reviews from critics, until the 2015 release for PC. Metacritic gave the Xbox 360 version an average score of 53 out of 100, while IGN gave the game a 5 out of 10, writing, "SEGA's history deserves better. And so do you." Eurogamer gave the game a positive review, scoring it a three out of five stars.

References

External links 
Dreamcast Collection at Sega's Official Site

2011 video games
Cancelled PlayStation 3 games
Dreamcast
Fishing video games
Sega video game compilations
Sonic the Hedgehog video games
Video games about taxis
Video games developed in Japan
Windows games
Xbox 360 games
Xbox 360 Live Arcade compilations